Siddapur is a village in Koppal district, Karnataka, India to the northeast of Gangawati town. It is located at 15.530, 76.636.

Gallery

References 

Villages in Koppal district